The Inconnue River (in French: rivière Inconnue) flows in the municipalities of Cap-Saint-Ignace and Notre-Dame-du-Rosaire, in the Montmagny Regional County Municipality, in the administrative region of Chaudière-Appalaches, in Quebec, in Canada.

The "Inconnue River" is a tributary of the east bank of the rivière des Perdrix, which flows towards the south bank of the Bras Saint-Nicolas; from there, the current flows to the southeast shore of the rivière du Sud (Montmagny); the latter flows north-east to the south shore of the St. Lawrence River.

Geography 
The main neighboring watersheds of the Inconnue River are:
 north side: rivière des Perdrix, St. Lawrence River, Bras Saint-Nicolas;
 east side: Fortin stream, Bras Saint-Nicolas, Cloutier River;
 south side: rivière des Perdrix, Cloutier River, rivière du Sud (Montmagny), Fraser River;
 west side: rivière des Perdrix, Morigeau River.

The Inconnue River has its source on the north slope of the Notre Dame Mountains, in the township of Bourdages, in the municipality of Cap-Saint-Ignace. Several branches of mountain and forest streams feed the head of the Inconnue River.

  southwesterly in Cap-Saint-Ignace, to the limit between Cap-Saint-Ignace and Notre-Dame-du-Rosaire;
  north-west in Notre-Dame-du-Rosaire, until its confluence.

The Inconnue River flows on the east bank of the Perdrix River (Bras Saint-Nicolas) in a small valley north of the Érables mountain.

Toponymy 
The toponym Rivière Inconnue was formalized on December 5, 1968, at the Commission de toponymie du Québec.

See also 

 List of rivers of Quebec

References 

Rivers of Chaudière-Appalaches
Montmagny Regional County Municipality